Hieracium morulum is a species of flowering plant belonging to the family Asteraceae.

Its native range is Scandinavia, and northern Russia to the Urals.

References

morulum
Flora of Norway
Flora of Sweden
Flora of Finland
Flora of North European Russia
Flora of East European Russia